3rd BSFC Awards
February 6, 1983

Best Film: 
 E.T. the Extra-Terrestrial 
The 3rd Boston Society of Film Critics Awards honored the best filmmaking of 1982. The awards were given on 6 February 1983.

Winners
Best Film:
E.T. the Extra-Terrestrial
Best Actor:
 Dustin Hoffman – Tootsie
Best Actress:
 Meryl Streep – Sophie's Choice
Best Supporting Actor:
 Mickey Rourke – Diner
Best Supporting Actress:
 Jessica Lange – Tootsie
Best Director:
Steven Spielberg – E.T. the Extra-Terrestrial
Best Screenplay:
Barry Levinson – Diner
Best Cinematography:
Allen Daviau – E.T. the Extra-Terrestrial
Best Documentary:
The Atomic Cafe
Best Foreign-Language Film:
Three Brothers (Tre fratelli) • Italy/France

External links
Past Winners

References
1982 Boston Society of Film Critics Awards Internet Movie Database

1982
1982 film awards
Boston
Boston
February 1983 events in the United States